Endy Chow Kwok-yin (born 11 December 1979) is a Hong Kong actor, singer and songwriter.

Early life 
Chow was born on 11 December 1979 at Hong Kong Sanatorium & Hospital in Happy Valley, his family immigrated to New Zealand when he was 13. He went to Japan to further his studies when he was 19.

Career 
At 15, Chow formed a band with friends (including current members of Climax), naming it Zarahn after the band's first guitar teacher. Thereafter, Zarahn composed more than 100 songs. He was signed to Warner Hong Kong as a solo artist in September 2003 after a friend, Candy Hung, helped pass his demo tape to composer and producer, Joannes Lam.

He currently has three releases: the 'Endy Chow EP', 'Greenhouse Balloon' and recently his new album 'Light'.

In 2005, he performed in the male lead role in Denise Ho's stage musical, "The Butterfly Lovers".

In a recent interview, Endy said that he is interested in the music industry because he likes to create music from scratch. He finds it very rewarding and thanks all his fans for the continuous support given.

Personal life 
In 2001, Chow married a Korean woman he met while studying in Japan. With his wife, Chow has three daughters named Clara, Rachael and Elisia. The couple ended their marriage in 2021.

Filmography

Film
 The Sunny Side of the Street (2022)
 One Second Champion (2020)
 Invincible Dragon (2019)
 Remember What I Forgot (2019)
 Love Is Cold (2017)
 The Midnight After (2014)
 Old Master Q and Little Ocean Tiger (2011)
 Cocktail (2006)
 Good Times, Bed Times (2006)
 The Invincible Dragon (2019)
 One Second Champion (2021)

Television series
 Stained (2017)
 3X1 (2016)
 ICAC Investigators 2011 (2011)
 Hearts of Fencing (2003)

MV Appearance (Actor)

Discography

Studio albums
《周國賢同名EP》(2004/March)]
《周國賢同名EP 》(2nd Version)(2004/April)]
《溫室汽球》(2004/Nov)]
《溫室汽球》(2nd Version)(2005/Jan)]
《光》 (2005/Nov)]
《光》(Special Edition)(2005/Dec)]
《College》(新曲+精選)(2009/June)]
《Implode》(2010/Oct)]
《This Is Not The End》(White+Black EP)(2011/July)]
《This Is Not The End》(Is The Beginning Version)(2011/Sept)]
《Project December》(2011/Dec)]
《Live A Life》(2012/Aug)]
《Live A Life》(2nd Version)(2012/Sept)]

Songwriting Works For Other Singers
As Composer
"坐看雲起時" by Jer Lau (2022) 
"七姊妹星團" (My Seven Stars) by Lolly Talk (2023)

References

External links
ENDY's Official Facebook Page
YouTube Page in BMA era
Endy's Directed Video's Work
Endy's Weibo Page
Endy's Instagram
Endy's Sina Twitter

1979 births
Living people
Hong Kong male singers
Hong Kong songwriters
Cantopop singers